The Fort St. John Huskies are a Canadian Junior "B" Ice Hockey team based in Fort St. John, British Columbia, Canada.  They are former members of the Peace-Cariboo Jr. B, Jr. A, and Rocky Mountain Junior Hockey League and current members of the Jr. B North West Junior Hockey League of Hockey Alberta.

History
The Golden Hawks were founded in 1966.  In the 1970s they were members of the Peace Junior B Hockey League.  In 1975, the league became the Peace-Cariboo Junior B Hockey League.  In 1980, the Peace-Cariboo League was promoted to Jr. A, and the Golden Hawks with it.

In 1981, the Golden Hawks became the Huskies.  In 1991, the PCJHL expanded into the Kootenays and became the Rocky Mountain Junior Hockey League.  In 1996, as many of the Peace-Cariboo area dropped out of the RMJHL to join the British Columbia Hockey League, the Huskies elected to join Hockey Alberta's newly formed North West Junior Hockey League, reuniting them with traditional opponents like the Dawson Creek Jr. Canucks.  The Huskies have been members ever since.

Season-by-season standings

Playoffs
1981 Lost Final
Fort St. John Golden Hawks defeated Quesnel Millionaires 4-games-to-1
Prince George Spruce Kings defeated Fort St. John Golden Hawks 4-games-to-3
1982 Lost Semi-final
Prince George Spruce Kings defeated Fort St. John Huskies 4-games-to-3
1983 DNQ
1984 DNQ
1985 Lost Final
Fort St. John Huskies defeated Grande Prairie North Stars 4-games-to-2
Prince George Spruce Kings defeated Fort St. John Huskies 4-games-to-none
1986 Lost Semi-final
Williams Lake Mustangs defeated Fort St. John Huskies 4-games-to-2
1987 Lost Semi-final
Grande Prairie North Stars defeated Fort St. John Huskies 4-games-to-3
1988 DNQ
1989 Lost Semi-final
Williams Lake Mustangs defeated Fort St. John Huskies 4-games-to-1
1990 Lost Final
Fort St. John Huskies defeated Quesnel Millionaires 4-games-to-none
Prince George Spruce Kings defeated Fort St. John Huskies 4-games-to-none
1991 Lost Semi-final
Williams Lake Mustangs defeated Fort St. John Huskies 4-games-to-none 
1992 Lost Semi-final
Fort St. John Huskies defeated Williams Lake Mustangs 4-games-to-1
Prince George Spruce Kings defeated Fort St. John Huskies 4-games-to-2
1993 DNQ
1994 Lost Final
Fort St. John Huskies defeated Grande Prairie Chiefs 4-games-to-3
Fort St. John Huskies defeated Prince George Spruce Kings 4-games-to-2
Kimberley Dynamiters defeated Fort St. John Huskies 4-games-to-1
1995 Lost Quarter-final
Prince George Spruce Kings defeated Fort St. John Huskies 4-games-to-none
1996 Lost Quarter-final
Prince George Spruce Kings defeated Fort St. John Huskies 4-games-to-1

Russ Barnes Trophy
Alberta Jr B Provincial Championships
Eight teams broken into 2 pools compete - ONly the applicable pool shown.

NHL alumni
Dody Wood

References

External links
Official website of the Fort St. John Huskies

Ice hockey teams in British Columbia
Fort St. John, British Columbia
1966 establishments in British Columbia
Ice hockey clubs established in 1966